In mathematical group theory, the balance theorem states that if G is a group with no core then G either has disconnected Sylow 2-subgroups or it is of characteristic 2 type or it is of component type .

The significance of this theorem is that it splits the classification of finite simple groups into three major subcases.

References

Theorems about finite groups